The fire-footed rope squirrel (Funisciurus pyrropus)  is a species of rodent in the family Sciuridae.

Description 
It is a relatively small rodent with an adult averaging at a height of 8.1 inches or 204.81 mm. Adults weigh between 225 and 240 grams.

Habitat 
It is found in West and Central Africa from Senegal to Uganda and south to Angola. Its natural habitats are subtropical or tropical moist lowland forests, moist savanna, and plantations.

Diet 
They are primarily herbivores. Their main diet consists of fruit and seeds. When food is scarce, they resort to eating small termites and ants.

Mating 
Several male squirrels chase a single female squirrel in a ritualistic chase. They bear litters of one to two pups.

References

Funisciurus
Rodents of Africa
Mammals described in 1833
Taxonomy articles created by Polbot